Ji Seo-yeon (Hangul: 지서연; born December 26, 2005) is a South Korean figure skater. She is the 2021 CS Autumn Classic International bronze medalist.

Programs

Competitive highlights 
GP: Grand Prix; CS: Challenger Series; JGP: Junior Grand Prix

Detailed results

Senior results

Junior-level results

References

External links 
 
 

2005 births
Living people
South Korean female single skaters
Sportspeople from Daejeon
21st-century South Korean women